The Lawu languages or Lawoish languages are a proposed branch of Loloish languages. Internal classification within Loloish is uncertain. It may form a branch of Central Loloish, or it may be an independent branch of Loloish. The Lawu languages are:
Lawu
Awu
Lewu

Cathryn Yang (2012) suggests that Lawu is most likely a Central Ngwi language, but notes that it does not classify with Lalo, Lahu, or the Lisoid (Lisu, Lipo, Lolopo) languages.

References

Lama, Ziwo Qiu-Fuyuan (2012), Subgrouping of Nisoic (Yi) Languages, thesis, University of Texas at Arlington (archived)